The  Cleveland Gladiators season is the 12th season for the franchise, their first season in Cleveland. The Gladiators finished the regular season with a 9–7 record, and made the playoffs as the 4th seed in the National Conference. In the Wild Card round of the playoffs, they defeated the Orlando Predators, 69–66. For their Divisional round game, they defeated the Georgia Force 73–70. In the National Conference Championship however, they were defeated 70–35 by the top-seeded Philadelphia Soul.

Standings

Regular season schedule

Playoff schedule

Coaching

Mike Wilpolt – head coach
Brian partlow – Offensive Coordinator
Willie Wood Jr. – WR, DB and Special Teams Coach
Lee johnson – Offensive/Defensive Line Coach
John tsironis – Strength & Conditioning Coach
Matt carlson – Video Coordinator

Final roster

Stats

Regular season

Week 1: vs. New York Dragons

Week 2: vs. Utah Blaze

Week 3: at Columbus Destroyers

Week 4: at New Orleans VooDoo

Week 5: Bye week

Week 6: at Dallas Desperados

Week 7: vs. Colorado Crush

Week 8: at Los Angeles Avengers

Week 9: at New York Dragons

Week 10: vs. Philadelphia Soul

Week 11: vs. Orlando Predators

Week 12: at Colorado Crush

Week 13: at Tampa Bay Storm

Week 14: vs. Dallas Desperados

Week 15: vs. Chicago Rush

Week 16: at Philadelphia Soul

Week 17: vs. Columbus Destroyers

Playoffs

National Conference Wild Card: vs. Orlando Predators

National Conference Divisional: at Georgia Force

National Conference Championship: at Philadelphia Soul

External links
Gladiators vs. Dragons Week 1 Box Score

Cleveland Gladiators
Cleveland Gladiators seasons
Cleve